The Karhumäki Karhu 48B was a Finnish 1950s four-seat monoplane.

Development
The Veljekset Karhumäki O/Y company had been formed in 1924 and concerned itself with licence manufacturing. In 1948 the company designed and built a prototype of the Karhu 48, a high-wing four-seat monoplane of mixed construction, with a fabric-covered steel-tube fuselage and fabric-covered wooden wings. This was followed up in 1949 with a second example, the Karhu 48B. A small number were built including a number on floats.

Specifications (Karhu 48B)

References

 
 
 

1950s Finnish civil utility aircraft
High-wing aircraft
Single-engined tractor aircraft
Aircraft first flown in 1948